Frances Boyle (born 1954) is a Canadian writer from Ottawa, Ontario. Her debut short story collection Seeking Shade, published in 2020, was nominated for the 2021 ReLit Award for short fiction and the 2021 Danuta Gleed Literary Award.

She previously published the poetry collections Portal Stones, Light-carved Passages, Apples and Roses and This White Nest, and the novella Tower.

References

External links

21st-century Canadian poets
21st-century Canadian novelists
21st-century Canadian short story writers
21st-century Canadian women writers
Canadian women poets
Canadian women novelists
Canadian women short story writers
Writers from Ottawa
Living people
1954 births